Robert Patterson (January 12, 1792 – August 7, 1881) was an Irish-born United States major general during the American Civil War, chiefly remembered for inflicting an early defeat on Stonewall Jackson, but crucially failing to stop Confederate General Joseph E. Johnston from joining forces with P. G. T. Beauregard at the First Battle of Bull Run. He is still blamed for this historic Union defeat.

Early life and War of 1812
Patterson was born in Cappagh, County Tyrone, Ireland.  His family was banished from Ireland due to his father's involvement in insurrectionism. In 1799, he emigrated to the United States, and eventually involved himself in banking. Patterson received his education in public schools and afterward became a clerk at a Philadelphia counting house. Volunteering for service during the War of 1812, he rose from the rank of captain to colonel in the 2nd Pennsylvania Militia, before joining the United States Army. He served in the Quartermaster General Department and was discharged in 1815 as a captain. Shortly thereafter, Patterson returned to his former commercial pursuits, this time in manufacturing, and established several mills, bringing extended influence to politics in Pennsylvania. Patterson was one of the five Col. Pattersons in the Pennsylvania Convention who nominated Andrew Jackson for the presidency and in 1836 was President of the Electoral College that cast the vote for Martin Van Buren.

Pennsylvania Militia
Patterson served as the Commander of the Pennsylvania State militia.  In 1838, he led troops to end the Anti-Abolition Riots in Philadelphia which led to the destruction of Pennsylvania Hall.  Again, in 1844, he helped put down the Philadelphia Bible Riots against Irish Catholics, resulting in the destruction of St. Michael's and St. Augustine's Churches.  The first riot took place in Kensington in May, and   another took place in Southwark in July.  On each occasion, Gen. Patterson led militia into combat with rioting civilians, leading to loss of life on both sides.

Mexican-American War service
Patterson was commissioned a major general of volunteers at the outbreak of the Mexican–American War and commanded the 2nd Division, Army of Occupation, during the Tampico Expedition. He was considered for command of the expedition to Veracruz which eventually went to Winfield Scott. He was, however, placed in command of the expedition's Volunteer Division and saw action during the Siege of Veracruz and at the Battle of Cerro Gordo, where he was wounded. He led the American pursuit of the Mexican Army and was the first to enter Jalapa. While the U.S. Army was stationed at Jalapa, Patterson returned to the U.S. with other volunteer units whose enlistment time had expired. He then resumed his business interests in Pennsylvania, where he acquired 30 cotton mills and became quite wealthy. Patterson became one of the largest mill-owners in the United States and heavily involved in sugar refineries and cotton plantations.  He again was an influential figure in Philadelphia politics.

Civil War service
The American Civil War brought Patterson back to military service. He was appointed major general of Pennsylvania volunteers and commanded the Department of Pennsylvania and the Army of the Shenandoah. In 1861, Winfield Scott, now General-in-Chief of the U.S. Army, gave Patterson vague orders to retake Harpers Ferry. Patterson failed to immediately act on these orders, was outmaneuvered after the Battle of Hoke's Run, and a Confederate army at Winchester, Virginia, under Brig. Gen. Joseph E. Johnston, was able to march without interference to reinforce the Confederates under P.G.T. Beauregard at the First Battle of Bull Run. Johnston did, however, declare that Patterson’s army had largely deterred him from pursuing the shattered and disorganised Union troops as they retreated back to Washington after the battle. Patterson, widely criticized for his failure to contain the enemy forces, was mustered out of the Army in late July 1861.

Postbellum life

Patterson again returned to his cotton milling business and wrote a book, A Narrative of the Campaign in the Valley of the Shenandoah, in 1861, published in 1865. He was also President of the Aztec Club of 1847 from 1867 to 1881 and was a Companion of the Military Order of the Loyal Legion of the United States. During his tenure as President of the Aztec Club, the Club accomplished what few of its contemporaries did—the successful metamorphosis from a military society to a hereditary one. Patterson was also a trustee of Lafayette College from 1826 to 1835, and president of the trustees from 1876 to 1881.

Patterson died in Philadelphia and is buried there in Laurel Hill Cemetery. His son Francis Engle Patterson and his son-in-law John Joseph Abercrombie were both Union generals during the American Civil War.  Patterson's mansion was located on the southwest corner of 13th and Locust Streets.  After Patterson’s death in 1881, the Historical Society of Pennsylvania purchased the mansion as its permanent home. The mansion was demolished between 1905 and 1909 and a new building dedicated in 1910.

See also

List of American Civil War generals (Union)

References

 Eicher, John H., and Eicher, David J., Civil War High Commands, Stanford University Press, 2001, .

1792 births
1881 deaths
People from County Tyrone
Irish emigrants to the United States (before 1923)
United States Army personnel of the War of 1812
American military personnel of the Mexican–American War
Members of the Aztec Club of 1847
Union Army generals
People of Pennsylvania in the American Civil War
Burials at Laurel Hill Cemetery (Philadelphia)
Lafayette College trustees
American militiamen in the War of 1812